Jean Becker may refer to:

 Jean Becker (violinist) (1833–1884), German violinist
 Jean Becker (director) (born 1933), French film director, screenwriter and actor
 Jean Becker (footballer) (1922–2009), Luxembourgish footballer